Created by Thomas Lawrence and Roy Suddaby (2006, pp. 217), the concept of institutional work refers to “the broad category of purposive action aimed at creating, maintaining, and disrupting institutions and businesses .” The focus of institutional work shifts away from more traditional institutional scholarship that offers strong accounts of the processes through which institutions govern action and, instead, examines how individuals’ active agency affects institutions. More recently the added value of the concept is explored in the context of environmental governance, where it offers novel opportunities for analysing the interactions between actors and institutional structures that produce stability and flexibility in governance systems.

In later work, Lawrence et al. (2011, pp. 52–53) specified the interest of institutional work in “the myriad, day-to-day equivocal instances of agency that, although aimed at affecting the institutional order, represent a complex mélange of forms of agency—successful and not, simultaneously radical and conservative, strategic and emotional, full of compromises, and rife with unintended consequences.

To understand institutional work and influences on institutions, an important idea to consider is path dependence, which states that past events constrain future outcomes. Highly prevalent in discussions of technological and economic development, a common example is the use of the QWERTY keyboard, a technologically inferior system that established long-term superiority over other options by gaining an initial advantage. When applied to political science, this idea can help explain how weak or inefficient institutions often resist change. 

One reason for path-dependence is that institutions are often self-reinforcing, as powerful organizations with the ability to enact change rose to prominence within the existing institutional structure, and thus are incentivized to maintain that same structure. An example is the American health care system, which is incredibly complex, but arranged to the benefit of companies, agencies, and other actors that have the ability to force change. Another reason is increasing returns to adoption, meaning that as an institution is more widely adopted and accepted, the transition costs of changing greatly increase. This is shown in the dominance of fossil fuels, as the costs of changing over to renewables is high. A third reason is lock-in effects, by which an initial, sometimes random event starts a spiral. An example is the 2020 Beirut Warehouse Explosion, which caused massive devastation, in turn leading to increased instability, distrust of government, and a spiral of political unrest. These mechanisms of path dependence contribute to explaining the difficulties actors face in influencing institutions, and add an important dimension to the study of institutional work.

References 

Social institutions